Recreational Equipment, Inc., doing business as REI, is an American retail and outdoor recreation services corporation. It is organized as a consumers' co-operative. REI sells camping gear, hiking, climbing, cycling, water, running, fitness, snow, travel equipment, and men, women and kids clothing. It also offers services such as outdoor-oriented vacations and courses.

REI operates 165 retail stores in 39 states. It also receives orders via mail-order catalogs and the internet.

History
Lloyd (1902–2000) and Mary Anderson (1909–2017) founded REI in Seattle, Washington in 1938. The Andersons imported an Akadem Pickel ice axe from Austria for themselves as part of The Mountaineers Basic Climbing Course, and decided to set up a co-operative to help other outdoor enthusiasts in the club acquire good quality climbing gear at reasonable prices. On June 23, 1938, with the help from Seattle attorney Ed Rombauer, five Mountaineers met at Rombauer's office, and each paid one dollar to join Recreational Equipment Cooperative. Lloyd and Mary were issued cards No. 1 and 2. 

During the first year, Recreational Equipment was nothing more than a shelf at the Puget Sound Cooperative Store, a farmer's co-op near Pike Place Market in Seattle. In 1942, Lloyd moved to a new space down the hall from The Mountaineers club rooms on Pike Street. Jim Whittaker was hired as the first full-time employee of REI on July 25, 1955. In 1956, Recreational Equipment Cooperative was incorporated. Whittaker served as CEO during the 1960s and was an early board member with American Alpine Club president Nicholas Clinch. When Whittaker became the first American to summit Mount Everest in May 1963, it provided REI with so much free advertising that the following year, 1964, its gross income topped $1mil for the first time.

Through the 1970s, it identified itself prominently as REI Co-op, focusing primarily on equipment for serious climbers, backpackers, and mountaineering expeditions. However, in the 1980s, with changes to its board of directors, the emphasis shifted toward family camping and branched out into kayaking, bicycling, and other outdoor sports. It acquired nearby outdoor gear firm Mountain Safety Research in 1981, which later bought tent-maker Edgeworks and produced tents with the MSR brand. REI kept MSR until 2001, when it exited the manufacturing business, selling the operation to Cascade Designs, another successful outdoor gear company in the Seattle area. Clothing, particularly "sport casual" clothes, also became a greater part of the company's product line. Although the company remained a co-operative, providing special services to its members, the "co-op" moniker was dropped from much of its literature and advertising. Beginning in 2014, with the introduction of the REI Co-Op line of clothing, REI publicly re-emphasized the cooperative aspect of its business model. In October 2015, the company launched a redesigned logo, which includes the word "co-op" for the first time since 1983.

Sally Jewell joined the board of REI in 1996 and in 2000 was named chief operating officer. She became CEO in 2005. Jewell remained CEO of REI until she was named United States Secretary of the Interior in April 2013. She was succeeded by Jerry Stritzke, former president and COO of Coach New York, who was named president and CEO of REI in August 2013. Stritzke resigned in February 2019. Eric Artz, previously COO of the company, was named CEO and president of REI in May 2019.

On Black Friday 2015, REI closed all of its stores, halted the processing of orders on its website, and gave all employees a paid day off. Although Black Friday has been one of REI's top 10 days for annual sales, the company abstained from Black Friday and launched an #OptOutside marketing campaign, urging people to spend their time outside. REI is the first major retailer to forgo operations on Black Friday. They continued the initiative through the 2022 holiday season.

On January 31, 2023, REI laid off 8 percent of its corporate staff, eliminating 167 positions.

Non-retail diversification 

REI has diversified its offerings into global adventure vacations through the REI Adventures branch, which began in 1987. REI Adventures offers vacations for active travelers all over the world.

In 2006, REI started the Outdoor School in selected markets. The Outdoor School is a series of one-day outings in the local area and in store classes. Offerings include mountain biking, road biking, kayaking, backpacking, rock climbing, outdoor photography, family hiking, snowshoeing and others. The current locations of the Outdoor School are the San Francisco Bay Area, Sacramento and Reno areas, the Los Angeles area, the San Diego area, Boston and New England area, New York Tri-State area, Philadelphia, Washington D.C./Maryland/Virginia area, Chicago area, Minneapolis area, Denver area, Atlanta area, Portland area, and Puget Sound area.

On June 11, 2015, REI bought Adventure Projects Inc., a Boulder-based company, founded by Nick Wilder and Mike Ahnemann in 2012, which is best known for its climbing website, Mountain Project (MountainProject.com), with guides to more than 128,000 climbing routes across the world. It has since expanded by creating MTBProject.com, a website for mountain bike trail maps, HikingProject.com, for hiking trails, PowderProject.com, for backcountry skiing trails, and TrailRunProject.com, for cross-country running trails.

In November 2016 REI started producing independent podcasts informally starting with Wild Ideas Worth Living by journalist Shelby Stanger. Since then they have also released Camp Monsters and Wildfire.

In February 2019, REI acquired Arizona-based adventure tour operator Arizona Outback Adventures. Arizona Outback Adventures had served as a vendor and operator of REI's adventure travel programs for over 15 years. The acquisition brought new tour and rental capabilities in house at REI and signaled a renewed efforts towards diversifying the company's experiential offerings.

Location
REI has a member owned co-operative headquartered in Kent, Washington. It is owned by its members, who each hold a single voting share. Members are entitled to a patronage dividend. A new headquarters campus in the Spring District of Bellevue, Washington, was announced in 2016 and planned to open in 2020. The sale of the new headquarters campus was announced in August 2020 amid the COVID-19 pandemic, with REI corporate employees shifting to remote work.

Its flagship stores are in the Cascade neighborhood of Downtown Seattle, which opened in 1996; Bloomington, Minnesota; Washington, DC; New York City; and Denver, Colorado. It has distribution centers in Sumner, Washington; Bedford, Pennsylvania; and Goodyear, Arizona.

Membership
REI is owned by its active members, persons who have paid a $30 lifetime membership fee. Each active member is entitled to vote for members of the company's board of directors and is eligible to receive a patronage dividend on qualifying purchases. The lifetime fee was just five dollars in 1985.

The annual reward is normally equal to 10% of what a member spent at REI on regular-priced merchandise in the prior year. The reward, which becomes unredeemable on December 31 two years from the date of issue, can be used as credit for further purchases.

REI members are allowed to buy returned/used/damaged goods at significant discounts at the REI Used Gear Sales. Other benefits of REI membership include discounts on rentals, deals on shipping charges, REI adventure trips, and shop services, as well as rock wall access at locations that feature indoor climbing walls. The locations include Flagship stores in Denver, Seattle, and Bloomington, as well as the Pittsburgh South Side Works store. Members also receive exclusive coupons throughout the year for around 20% off of full-price items.

Governance

REI is a Washington corporation governed by a board of 13 directors, including the CEO. Directors serve for terms of one or three years. Board candidates are selected by the REI Board Nomination and Governance Committee. In earlier years, board elections were competitive elections, with both board-nominated and self-nominated petition candidates. In recent years, REI eliminated the opportunity for petition candidates and has nominated only as many candidates as open positions. Members are mailed a ballot, and nominees must garner 50% of returned ballots; members may also vote online. While the board serves at the members' pleasure, there is no path to board membership without the approval of the Board Nomination and Governance Committee.  For 2014, its chief executive officer received compensation of approximately $2.71 million per year.

Business model
Although the Andersons originally established the co-op structure to secure reduced prices for its members, REI now models itself as a boutique full-service retailer, with a website including order-on-the-web and free delivery to a nearby store, rather than as a low-price retailer. Local stores host free clinics on outdoor topics and organize short trips originating from the store to explore local hikes and cycling paths.

REI outlets are often positioned as anchor stores in upmarket strip malls. In common with other retailers, REI stores tend to receive most of their traffic during the weekend.

Although most of what it sells is brandname merchandise from other companies, REI designs and sells its own private-label products under the REI, REI Co-Op, Co-Op cycles brands.

Labor
REI employed over 15,000 people as of January 2022, most of them in the stores, many of whom are part-time. Employees receive discounts on merchandise, may be eligible for free or discounted outdoor classes, and also receive a "Way day" pass, entitling them to spend up to 6 hours outdoors for pay. REI has been ranked in the top 100 Companies to Work For in the United States by Fortune since 1985, which earned it a place in the Fortune "Hall of Fame". REI ranked as #8 in 2012, #69 in 2014, #58 in 2015, #26 in 2016, and #28 in 2017.

Labor organizing and criticism 

Since 2013, REI workers have been publicly organizing around workplace issues such as living wages, erratic and insufficient scheduling, access to benefits like healthcare, and safety protocols. While the cooperative does not currently have any trade unions, the company has been accused of union busting by forcing employees to attend anti-union meetings, putting up anti-union flyers, using "social justice language" and its status as a cooperative to mislead the public into believing it is a worker cooperative. Workers have organized at least 5 petitions since 2016, and in January 2022, the SoHo, Manhattan location filed REI's first-ever National Labor Relations Board petition to vote to become a union. In March 2022, the SoHo based workers voted overwhelmingly in favor of unionization with the Retail, Wholesale, and Department Store Union (RWDSU) by a vote of 88-14.

Environmental and community initiatives 
In 2006, REI purchased 11 million kWh of green power, enough to offset 20% of its overall power consumption. That placed REI on the US Environmental Protection Agency's top ten list of retailers in purchases of cleanly-generated electricity. By 2007, REI promises to make its trips through REI Adventures carbon neutral by the purchasing of green power credits "Green Tags". REI Adventures states that it is the first US travel company to introduce that type of program. REI has pledged to be a climate neutral and zero waste to landfill company in 2020 by focusing on the five areas of its business: green buildings, product stewardship, proper paper usage, reducing waste and energy efficiency. As of 2020, REI has also pledged to halve its carbon footprint, and has begun to offset its emissions by cutting emissions throughout its business processes, especially in the supply chain.

To support local communities, REI offers meeting space free of charge to non-profit organizations, supports conservation efforts, and organizes yearly outdoor service outings. REI donates annually to conservation groups in the US. Its 2007 giving of $3.7 million represented about 0.28% of its $1.3 billion in gross sales. It also sends volunteers to help groups with cleaning up the environment, building new trails, and teaching children the importance of caring for the environment.

REI is a key sponsor of The Access Fund, a non-profit organization committed to keeping America's climbing areas open by education, environmental protection, and advocacy.

After the Stoneman Douglas High School shooting, REI joined the 2018 NRA boycott and suspended orders from Vista Outdoor, a maker of outdoor products and rifles.

See also

References

External links 

1938 establishments in Washington (state)
American companies established in 1938
Clothing companies established in 1938
Manufacturing companies established in 1938
Retail companies established in 1938
Camping equipment manufacturers
Clothing retailers of the United States
Companies based in Kent, Washington
Consumers' cooperatives
Cooperatives in the United States
Mail-order retailers
Climbing and mountaineering equipment companies
Online retailers of the United States
Outdoor clothing brands
Sporting goods retailers of the United States